The Apex Theory is the second extended play by the American rock band Mt. Helium, formerly The Apex Theory. Released on October 9, 2001, it was the band's first release on a major label.

Track listing

Personnel 
The Apex Theory
 Ontronik — vocals
 Art Karamian — guitar
 Dave Hakopyan — bass guitar
 Sammy J. Watson — drums

References 

2001 EPs
Mt. Helium EPs